Donatien Mortelette (born 26 April 1982) is a French rower. He competed in the men's eight event at the 2004 Summer Olympics.

References

1982 births
Living people
French male rowers
Olympic rowers of France
Rowers at the 2004 Summer Olympics
People from Armentières
Sportspeople from Nord (French department)